Mahonia oiwakensis is a species of plant in the barberry family, Berberidaceae. It is native to Taiwan, China ( Guizhou, Hong Kong, Sichuan, Xizang (Tibet) and Yunnan) and Myanmar, where it occurs at elevations of 600 to 3800 m. It has recently been found naturalized in South Africa.

Nomenclature 
This species has long been known by the name Mahonia lomariifolia, published by Takeda in 1917. Under that name, it was considered to occur only in mainland China, while on Taiwan, a second species was found, known as M. oiwakensis. Modern taxonomic sources unite the two as a single species, but as the latter name was published a year earlier by Hayata, it has priority and is thus the accepted name. In recognition of the morphological differences between the Taiwanese and mainland Chinese plants, Shaw recognized the two as subspecies of Mahonia oiwakensis: M. oiwakensis subsp. oiwakensis in Taiwan and M. oiwakensis subsp. lomariifolia in mainland China. In addition, a plant collected in Yunnan with especially narrow leaflets was described as a new variety: Mahonia oiwakensis subsp. lomariifolia var. tenuifoliola.

Description 
Mahonia oiwakensis is a shrub or tree up to 7 m tall. Leaves are up to 45 cm long, compound with 12-20 pairs of leaflets plus a larger terminal one, dark green above, yellow-green below. The inflorescence is a fascicled raceme up to 25 cm long. The berries are egg-shaped, dark blue, sometimes almost black, up to 8 mm long.

Hybrids 
Mahonia oiwakensis subsp. lomariifolia is one parent of the important garden hybrid Mahonia x media, which includes popular cultivars such as 'Charity', 'Winter Sun' and 'Lionel Fortescue' (the other parent is Mahonia japonica). It is also a parent of the cultivar 'Arthur Menzies', though with Mahonia bealei as the other parent. In the wild in Taiwan, M. oiwakensis subsp. oiwakensis appears to hybridize with wild Mahonia japonica.

Mahonia oiwakensis subsp. lomariifolia has gained the Royal Horticultural Society’s Award of Garden Merit.

References 

Flora of China
oiwakensis
Vulnerable plants
Plants described in 1916
Taxonomy articles created by Polbot